VH1's Big in '05 was an award show that aired on VH1 on December 4, 2005 on VH1 in the United States. It is the annual VH1's Big in... Awards. Fall Out Boy was one of the performers.

List of winners
BIG Entertainer – Kanye West
BIG Music Artist – Green Day
BIG Download – Hollaback Girl
BIG Breakthrough – Fall Out Boy
BIG Reality Star – Bo Bice
BIG Shocker – Michael Jackson
BIG Stylin' – Jessica Simpson
BIG Feud – Angelina Jolie vs Jennifer Aniston
BIG Quote – Kanye West
BIG Old School Triumph – INXS
BIG "IT" Girl – Lindsay Lohan

References

External links

VH1 original programming
American music awards